Ruellia tuberosa, also known as  minnieroot, fever root, snapdragon root and sheep potato, is a species of flowering plant in the family Acanthaceae. Its native range is in Central America but presently it has become naturalized in many countries of tropical South and Southeast Asia.

Some butterfly species, like the lemon pansy (Junonia lemonias) and the mangrove buckeye (Junonia genoveva), feed on the leaves of Ruellia tuberosa.

Description and properties
It is a small biennial plant with thick fusiform tuberous roots and striking funnel-shaped violet-colored flowers. Some of the names of the plant such as popping pod, duppy gun and cracker plant come from the fact that children like to play with the dry pods that pop when rubbed with spit or water.

Ruellia tuberosa may be found in moist and shady environments. It grows, however, preferably in grasslands and roadsides—often as a weed in cultivated fields, and also in xerophile and ruderal habitats.

In folk medicine and Ayurvedic medicine it is believed to be diuretic, anti-diabetic, antipyretic, analgesic, antihypertensive, and gastroprotective, and has been used for gonorrhea.

It is also used as a natural dye for textiles.

See also

 21540 Itthipanyanan, an asteroid named after the author of an award-winning study on Ruellia tuberosa

References

External links

Ruellia, ruellia tuberosa, popping pod: Philippine herbal medicine

tuberosa
Medicinal plants
Plant dyes
Plants described in 1753
Taxa named by Carl Linnaeus
Flora of Mexico
Flora of South America